Egypt Township is a township in Carroll County, in the U.S. state of Missouri.

Egypt Township was named after the country of Egypt.

References

Townships in Missouri
Townships in Carroll County, Missouri